For My Friends is the third studio album by American rock band Blind Melon, released April 22, 2008. It is their first album in thirteen years, and the first to feature lead singer Travis Warren who was recruited after the death of previous lead singer Shannon Hoon.

Track listing
All songs written by Blind Melon as One (Glen Graham, Brad Smith, Rogers Stevens, Christopher Thorn and Travis Warren)

Personnel
Blind Melon
Travis Warren – lead vocals, acoustic guitar
Christopher Thorn – rhythm guitar, lap steel, Wurlitzer electric piano
Rogers Stevens – lead guitar, piano
Brad Smith – bass, percussion, backing vocals
Glen Graham – drums, percussion
Technical
Brooks Byrd Graham, Danny Clinch, Heather Thorn - photography

Charts

References

2008 albums
Blind Melon albums